The Trout River is a tributary of the Liard River in far northern British Columbia, Canada, flowing northwest from headwaters at , near Muncho Lake, to meet the Liard at the community of Liard River.   It is at the upper end of the Grand Canyon of the Liard, which is part of Liard River Corridor Provincial Park and Protected Area.

References

Rivers of British Columbia
Liard Country
Rivers of the Canadian Rockies